Patne is a village in Kolhapur District in the southwestern state of Maharashtra, India.

History
There are evidences showing Stone Age habitation in Patne including ostrich eggshell beads, chalcedony and jasper tools. In medieval times, the village was held by the Nikhumbas  as a feudatory of the Yadavas. Inscriptions of these people have been found at the ruins of old Patne which lies 1.5 km south of Patne village.

Population
In 2011, there were 1099 people living in Patne in 254 families. Some families are of Chardo origin.

Location
Patne is situated on the left bank of the Ad Nala river, a tributary of the Tapti river. The nearest large town is Belgaum to the East. To the south are the Ajanti Hills

Language
Konkani is spoken by Goan migrants to Patne.

Sites 
 Pithalkora caves and Stone Age archeological site.
 Kedarkund Falls, waterfalls on the Ad Nala river.

References

Villages in Kolhapur district